Tim Swales  (born in Yarm, England) is a former motorcycle speedway rider in National League (speedway) and British League.

Career
Tim Swales, through his career, rode mostly for Teessiders/Tigers and Newcastle Diamonds with loans to other teams, turning in good scores in the middle ranks. Middlesbrough had been known as "Teessiders" (1969-1972) and "Tigers" (1973), becoming "Bears" in 1974, returning to an earlier nickname.
He appeared on the cover of the Speedway Star (w/e 9 September 1972) with brother Tony.
He became a promoter at Redcar Bears, a role he was followed in by nephew, Jamie Swales. The Swales family was widely involved in speedway, Jack Swales (1963-1965 at Middlesbrough), Tony Swales (1970-1974 at Teesside), and Andrew, Stuart and Matthew.
Tim Swales also had a spell as chair of the British Promoters' Speedway Association (BSPA) and served on the FIM.

After Speedway
Married to Sally (who also had a spell co-promoting), they have a son and daughter and grandchildren. The family business is a motor garage at Osmotherley.
Tim Swales served as a Councillor on the North Yorkshire Council, elected in 2004, representing the North Hambleton district and serving as Chairman 2014-2015

References

External links
 Tim Swales | Speedway riders, history and results
 Middlesbrough-Speedway
 Middlesbrough 
 Councillor Tim Swales elected as chairman of North Yorkshire Council for 2014-15  
 Historic election results  (2013)

1948 births
English motorcycle racers
British speedway riders
Newcastle Diamonds riders
Middlesbrough Bears riders
Sunderland_Stars riders
Wolverhampton Wolves riders
Scunthorpe Saints riders
Living people